Horden is a village in County Durham

Horden may also refer to:

Places
 Horden Colliery
 Horden, Kent
 Hörden am Harz, Germany

People
 Horden (surname), including a list of people with that name

Sport
 Horden Athletic F.C.
 Horden Colliery Welfare A.F.C.
 Horden Rugby Club